Samba Gadjigo (born 12 October 1954), is a Senegalese filmmaker and writer. He is most notable as the director of critically acclaimed film Sembene!.

Personal life
He was born on 12 October 1954 in Kidira, Senegal. He graduated from the University of Dakar and Ecole Normale Supérieure de Dakar. Then he received his PhD from the University of Illinois at Urbana-Champaign. He currently works as the Professor of French in Mount Holyoke College, Massachusetts since 1986.

Career
In 2015, he directed the film Sembene! along with Jason Silverman. The film was based on the life of Senegalese filmmaker Ousmane Sembène often known as the father of African cinema. The film had its first public screening at Sundance Film Festival in Utah. The film received critical acclaim and won several awards and accolades at international film festivals. The film was a finalist for the Camera d’Or in the 2015 Cannes Film Festival as well as won the Jury Prize at the 2016 Luxor African Film Festival. It also won the Prix de la Jeuness at the 2017 Escales Documentaires de Libreville and then won the Paul Robeson Prize at the 2016 Newark Black Film Festival. The film later received the Prize for Best Documentary at the Emerge Film Festival.

In 2016, Gadjigo received the Faculty Award for Scholarship. Apart from filmmaking, he is also a prolific author and contributed with African Cinema and Human Rights, Research in African Literatures, and Contributions in Black Studies. In March 2016, he was honored with Meribeth E. Cameron Faculty Award for Scholarship from Mount Holyoke College.

Filmography

See also
 Cinema of Africa

References

External links
 
 Giving papers in France and Senegal
 Film Screening: SEMBENE! The Inspiring Story of the Father of African Cinema with Director Samba Gadjigo

Living people
Senegalese film directors
Senegalese academics
Senegalese writers
Senegalese film producers
1954 births
Mount Holyoke College faculty